Brian Wilson Presents Pet Sounds Live is the second live album by American musician Brian Wilson. It features a performance of the Beach Boys' 1966 album Pet Sounds, recorded by Wilson and his band at the Royal Festival Hall in London in January 2002.

Track listing

Personnel

Brian Wilson – vocals, keyboards, arrangements
Mike D'Amico - vocals, percussion 
Scott Bennett – keyboards, vibraphone, percussion, vocals
Jeffrey Foskett, Nick Walusko – guitar, vocals
Probyn Gregory – guitar, French horn, trumpet, Theremin, keyboards, vocals
Jim Hines – drums, vocals
Bob Lizik – bass guitar
Paul Mertens – tenor & baritone saxophone, flute, alto flute, clarinet, harmonica
Taylor Mills – percussion, vocals
Andy Paley – percussion, guitar
Darian Sahanaja –  keyboards, vibraphone, vocals

References

Brian Wilson albums
2002 live albums
The Beach Boys music
Sanctuary Records live albums
Albums produced by Brian Wilson